Vivekanand Pandey is an Indian politician of the Nishad Party. He is a member of the 18th Uttar Pradesh Assembly, representing the Khadda Assembly constituency.

References 

Uttar Pradesh MLAs 2022–2027
Year of birth missing (living people)
Living people
Place of birth missing (living people)
NISHAD Party politicians